Crommelynck may refer to:
 Fernand Crommelynck (1886–1970), Belgian dramatist
 Aldo Crommelynck (1931–2008), Belgian printmaker, son of Fernand 
 Duo Crommelynck (1974–1994), classical piano duo of Patrick Crommelynck and Taeko Kuwata 
 Eva van Crommelynck, a character in novels by David Mitchell